Sudbury/Azilda Water Aerodrome  is located in Sudbury, Ontario, Canada,  northwest of downtown on the shore of Whitewater Lake, near the community of Azilda.

The UNICOM 122.8 is operated by Sudbury Aviation.

See also
 Greater Sudbury Airport
 Sudbury/Coniston Airport
 Sudbury/Ramsey Lake Water Aerodrome

References

External links

Registered aerodromes in Ontario
Transport in Greater Sudbury
Buildings and structures in Greater Sudbury
Seaplane bases in Ontario